Ernest Leclère (April 22, 1865 – May 27, 1938) was a Luxembourgian politician.  A member of Luxembourg's Chamber of Deputies for the Socialist Party, he served two short stints as a minister during the German occupation during the First World War.  His first position was as the Director-General for the Interior from 3 March 1915 until 6 November 1915.  Later he served in the first National Union Government as Director-General for Agriculture, Commerce, and Industry from 3 January 1917 until 19 June 1917.

Footnotes

References
 

Members of the Chamber of Deputies (Luxembourg)
Members of the Council of State of Luxembourg
Luxembourgian people of World War I
Luxembourg Socialist Workers' Party politicians
Luxembourgian jurists
1865 births
1938 deaths